Christine Smith is the name of:

Christine Smith (model) (born 1979), American Playboy model
Christine Smith (politician) (born 1946), former Labor member of the Queensland Legislative Assembly
Christine Smith (skier) (1946–1979), Olympic skier for Australia
Christine Shoecraft Smith (1866–1954), 13th president of the National Association of Colored Women's Clubs
 Christine Collins (rower) (born 1969), American rower
Tina Smith full name Christine Elizabeth Flint Smith (born 1958), junior United States senator from Minnesota

See also
Christina Smith (disambiguation)
Chris Smith (disambiguation)
Christopher Smith (disambiguation)
Christian Smith (disambiguation)